Ewan Coetzee (born ) is a South African rugby union player for the  in the Currie Cup. His regular position is lock or flanker.

Coetzee was named in the team for the fourth round of Super Rugby Unlocked against , making his debut in the process.

References

South African rugby union players
1997 births
Living people
Rugby union locks
Rugby union flankers
Griquas (rugby union) players